Ane Dahl Torp (born 1 August 1975 in Bærum, Norway) is a Norwegian actress.

Career 
Torp had her first film appearance in The Woman of My Life (2003). She has received Amanda Awards for her performances as Trude Eriksen in Svarte penger, hvite løgner (TV, 2004), as Nina Skåtøy in the film Gymnaslærer Pedersen (2006), and for her supporting role in Lønsj.

Torp was named a "Shooting Star" at the Berlin Film Festival in 2006. She also starred in Uro (2006), and played the role Gisela in the Norwegian/Swedish action television series Code Name Hunter (Kodenavn Hunter, 2007), for which she won the Gullruten award for best female actor in 2007.

Personal life 
Torp is the daughter of Norwegian linguistics professor Arne Torp. On October 20, 2007, she married jazz trumpeter Sjur Miljeteig. They live in Oslo and have two children, a boy (2010) and a girl (2012).

Filmography 
Fire høytider (2000) (as Hanne Åsland) (mini TV Series) (Won 2001 Amanda Award for Best TV Drama)
Anolit (2002) (as Jane) (Won "European Grand Prix" Award at " Brest European Short Film Festival " 2003)
Kvinnen i mitt liv (2003) (as Nina) (Nominated for the 2004 Emden Film Award)
Mors Elling (2003) (as Stewardess)
Svarte penger, hvite løgner (2004) (as Trude Eriksen) (TV Series) (Won 2004 Amanda Awards for "Best TV Drama" and "Best Actress": Ane Dahl Torp)
Hos Martin (as shop assistant) (TV-series, one episode, 2004)
Pappa (2004)
Ikke naken (2004) (as Nora) (Won awards both at "Lübeck Nordic Film Days 2004", "Berlin International Film Festival 2005" and "Newport International Film Festival 2005")
De vanskeligste ordene i verden (2005) (as the woman)
Gymnaslærer Pedersen (2006) (as Nina Skåtøy)
Uro (2006) (as Mette)
Kodenavn Hunter (2007) (as Gisela Søderlund a.k.a. Kikki) (mini TV Series)
Radiopiratene (2007) (as Mamma Grannemann)
 Død Snø / Dead Snow (2009) (as Sara Henriksen) 
Kong Curling (2011) (as Trine Kristine)
Gnade (2012) (as Linda)
Pioneer (2013)
1001 Grams (2014)
The Wave (2015)
Occupied (2015–2020)
The Quake (2018)
Charter (2020)

Awards 
 Amanda Award 2008: Best Supporting Actress (for Lønsj, 2008)
 Amanda Award 2004: Best Actress (for: Svarte penger, hvite løgner, 2004)
 Amanda Award 2006: Best Actress (for: Gymnaslærer Pedersen, 2006)
Gullruten Award 2007: Best female actor (for: Kodenavn Hunter, 2007)
Gullruten Award 2018: Best female actor (for: Heimebane, 2018).

References

External links 

1975 births
Living people
Norwegian film actresses
Norwegian television actresses
People from Bærum